The Keystone Bridge Company, founded in 1865 by Andrew Carnegie, was an American bridge building company. It was one of the 28 companies absorbed into the American Bridge Company in 1900. The company advertised its services for building steel, wrought iron, wooden railway and road bridges. It held a patent for wrought iron bridges and also supplied wrought iron columns for buildings. Thomas Carnegie worked for Keystone Bridge as treasurer for roughly 20 years, from the founding of the company until his death in 1886.

Keystone is perhaps best remembered for the Eads Bridge in St. Louis, completed in 1874, which survives to this day.

A number of its works are listed on the U.S. National Register of Historic Places.

Carnegie sold his company, Carnegie Steel Company to J.P. Morgan in 1901.

Works include (attribution):
Fairground Street Bridge (built 1895), spans ICG RR yard on Fairground St. Vicksburg, MS (Keystone Bridge Co.), NRHP-listed
Hannibal Bridge or Kansas City Bridge, spanned the Missouri River at Kansas City, MO, (constructed 1867–9) for the Hannibal & St. Joseph Railroad.  (Keystone Bridge Co.). 
Nokesville Truss Bridge, NE of Nokesville on VA 646 Nokesville, VA (Keystone Bridge Co.), NRHP-listed
Oak Ridge Railroad Overpass, SW of Shipman on VA 653 Shipman, VA (Keystone Bridge Co.), NRHP-listed
Pine Creek Park Bridge, N of Old Dam Rd., over Pine Cr. Fairfield, CT (Keystone Bridge Co.), NRHP-listed
Riverside Avenue Bridge, Riverside Ave. and RR tracks Greenwich, CT (Keystone Bridge Co.), NRHP-listed
Valley Road Bridge, Stewartstown Railroad, Stewartstown RR tracks over Valley Rd., Hopewell Township Stewartstown, PA (Keystone Bridge Co.), NRHP-listed
White Water Creek Bridge, Whitewater Rd. over White Water Cr. Bernard, IA (Keystone Bridge Co.), NRHP-listed
Windsor Harbor Road Bridge, Windsor Harbor Rd. at Rock Creek Kimmswick, MO (Keystone Bridge Company), NRHP-listed
Keystone Bridge, Over North Fork of the South Platte River for access to the Mountain hiking trail Bailey Co. (Keystone Bridge Company)

References

Construction and civil engineering companies of the United States
Companies based in Pittsburgh
Bridge companies
1865 establishments in Pennsylvania
Construction and civil engineering companies established in 1865
American companies established in 1865
Andrew Carnegie